Birregurra is a town on Gulidjan Country in Victoria, Australia approximately  south-west of Melbourne. The town is located within the Colac Otway Shire. At the 2016 census, Birregurra had a population of 828.

Birregurra is an Aboriginal word thought to mean ‘kangaroo camp'.

In 1839, the Wesleyan missionaries and colonial government established the Buntingdale Mission Station in the area - Victoria's first Aboriginal mission.

A Post Office opened in the area on 1 October 1858 and was renamed Mount Gellibrand in 1894, a few days before another office nearby was opened as Birregurra.

The railway through the town was opened in 1877, as part of the line to the south west of the state. A branch line to Forrest left the main line here, opened in 1891 and closed in 1957. The local railway station is served by V/Line passenger services on the Warrnambool line.

The town has an Australian Rules football team competing in the Colac & District Football League.

Golfers play at the Birregurra Golf Club on Hopkins Street.

Birregurra is home to the restaurant Brae, which was number 44 in The World's 50 Best Restaurants, 2017.

The town has a Primary School which has approximately 85 students and is located on Beal Street.

Local events
The town is host to the Birregurra Festival and Art Show. It starts each year on the 2nd full weekend of the month of October.

A produce market is held on the second Sunday of each month from November to April, where local vendors sell cakes, jewellery, plants, fresh fruit and vegetables, wine, arts and crafts. Organisers hold a barbecue for patrons of the market and all proceeds return to the community. The town has cafes, serving food and coffee, a local providore showcasing local produce, The Royal Mail Hotel, a General Store, some gift shops and a hairdresser.

Birregurra was the setting for the fictional Victorian town of Haven Bay in the Channel 10 television series The Henderson Kids.

Notable people
 Mary Glowrey (1887–1957), an Australian born and educated doctor who spent 37 years in India, where she set up healthcare facilities, services and systems, was born in Birregurra
 Firth McCallum (1872–1910) was an Australian rules footballer with Geelong and was named among the top players of the 1899 VFL season

References

External links

Community website

 Birregurra Festival & Art Show
Colac Otway Shire
Birregurra Primary School

Towns in Victoria (Australia)
Western District (Victoria)